The Nora B-52 is a 155 mm self-propelled howitzer developed by Military Technical Institute and manufactured by Yugoimport SDPR in Velika Plana, Serbia.

History
The first self-propelled Nora B (developed on the basis of Nora C) was designed by the Military Technical Institute in 1984 with a modified 152 mm Nora M-84 howitzer mounted on an FAP 8x8 truck bed and was a third generation of artillery systems. Later, in 2000s, Military Technical Institute developed new versions of 4th generation artillery systems with 52 caliber 155 mm gun for fitting on a new system of Nora family with B-52 designation.

Variants

B-52 operation depending on version is fully automated, including a 36-round autoloader. It is made in several versions:
 K0
first serial variant, open turret, manual power drive and line of sight.
 K1(S)
differences from K0:semi-open turret, full automatic, independent automatic navigation, automatic fire and control system, smaller crew number.
 M03
semi-open turret, automatic based on K0,K1 designs with S designation for Serbia Army.
 KE
semi-open turret, full automatic export variant.
 K-I
K1 with additional armored full automatic with closed turret, new stronger chassis, radar on barrel for measuring projectile trajectory and speed, NBC protected cabin and turret, automated fire-suspension system, smoke grenade launcher, intercom for crew and new software, designated M15 for Serbia.
 MGS-25 Aleksandar
Newest version planned since 2009 is designated as K2 (25 liter chamber, higher rate of fire, laser guided long range ammunition, smaller crew, new automated functions, smaller weight~25 tonnes, automatic leveling of gun in north direction,new smoke and light grenade) with development started later probably in 2012. As of 2017 at international arms fair Partner 2017 in Belgrade and after a few years of development it was presented newly developed prototype model named "Alexander", It has a new designation now and instead K2 it is called MGS-25 named "Alexander" and comes with 12 rounds ready for fire in a revolver type of automatic loader and has 12 additional ammunition that are stored in a storage box located at back behind the crew cabin and engine-hydraulic compartment. The automatic loading system can reloaded ammunition compartment in a back of a gun.  MGS-25 has a rate of fire of 6 rounds per minute and can continue firing operations until all ammunition is used. The Aleksandar has a maximum firing range of 32,5 km with standard ammunition and 56 km with the 155 mm HE ERFB RA/BB (VLAP). It can use all available ammunition on market for 155mm howitzers designed to withstand pressure in a new larger chamber. MGS-25 can be remotely controlled by crew via separate remote control up to 100 meters from vehicle thanks to high level of automation of all functions. As fully autonomous module it can be mounted on different trucks chassis - Kamaz and MAN versions presented until now.

K designation stands for Kamaz chassis, number for orientation of main weapon in relationship to north and letter for level of equipment and/or export designation. It is possible on demand to equip Nora B-52 howitzer with 152 mm gun.

All versions have differences in chassis, armour, turret, loading and support system. All versions with automatic loader features multiple rounds simultaneous impact capability. Standard equipment includes a computerized fire control system and a land navigation system. Ballistic protection is provided against small arms fire, shell splinters and some mines.

For training and simulation purposes special computer simulator  was developed by Mihajlo Pupin Institute that includes terrain maps of customer country with ability to train up to 3 battery of Nora B-52 or up to division of 18 gun, including crews for artillery designation on targets.

Special truck chassis upgrade as  resupply vehicle for ammunition reload was developed and used within battery of Nora B-52 self-propelled howitzer.

Operational history

Serbia has exported the Nora B-52 artillery systems (B-52 selected versions of self-propelled howitzer K1, KE, KI), reconnaissance BOV M11, command (BOV M10) and battery fire control and meteorological vehicles, ammunition loading trucks, artillery battlefield software for platoon, battery and division level) to the armed forces of Myanmar, Kenya and Bangladesh. One fully equipped battery usually consist of 6-12 self-propelled howitzer, reconnaissance 1-2 BOV M11, three command BOV M10(1 for each platoon and 1 for battery command), 3-6 munition trucks, communication and  workshop vehicle, 2-3 general supply vehicles (fuel, food, water etc.) and 1-2 fire direction and gunfire locator vehicle with radar and sound ranging. With latest order for Cyprus instead BOV M11 the new BOV M16 Miloš was delivered as artillery reconnaissance and  artillery battery command vehicle.

Ammunition
There are various type of ammunition available that includes domestic and foreign 155mm projectiles as it is JBMOU-compatible. Depending on ammo used different maximum ranges  and effects on target can be achieved.

Operators

Current operators
  Bangladesh: 36-54 (sources vary) in service with the Bangladesh Army (fitted with SAGEM Sigma 30 inertial navigation platform system for autonomous navigation and pointing)
  Cyprus: 24 in service with the Cypriot National Guard
  Kenya: 18 in service, 12 more on order
  Myanmar: 30 in service with the Myanmar Army
  Serbia: 18 in service with the Serbian Army

Future operators 

 : 54 on order

Potential operators
 : tested by Pakistan Army in 2017
 : tested by UAE Army in 2017
 : one howitzer on MAN chassis tested by the U.S. Army in 2021 as shoot-off participant together with Archer Artillery System, CAESAR self-propelled howitzer and ATMOS 2000

See also

Archer
DRDO ATAGS
ATMOS 2000
A-222 Bereg
2S22 Bohdana
CAESAR
DANA
G6 Rhino
AHS Kryl
PCL-09
PCL-161
PCL-181
PLL-09
Type 19 
ZUZANA

References

External links
Video demonstration
English language online article describing this SPG

155 mm artillery
Wheeled self-propelled howitzers
Self-propelled artillery of Serbia
Serbian inventions
Military Technical Institute Belgrade
Military vehicles introduced in the 2000s